Vik is a village in Vestnes Municipality in Møre og Romsdal county, Norway. It is connected with the Tomra area in the inner Tomrefjord.

Vik has an MC club and the society house Idahall–where there is located a football field as well. Down by the shore there is a beach known as "Vikstranda" (literally meaning Vik beach), and a small-boat marina. During the late 1990s to early 2010s there also used to be a fast-food restaurant in the village. North of the Vik village there is a light industrial area known as Trohaugen which is the location of many local businesses and companies.

References

Villages in Møre og Romsdal
Vestnes